Business-to-government (B2G), also known as business-to-administration (B2A), refers to trade between the business sector as a supplier and a government body as a customer.

B2G is a fundamental market, alongside Business-to-Consumer (B2C) and Business-to-Business (B2B). It is a relevant marketing and sales area, distinct from B2B or B2C. Other terms used are B2PA Business-to-Public-Administration; B2PS - Business-to-Public-Sector; PS public sector; PP public procurement.

The B2G domain is relevant: public sector represents 54% of EU GDP, and 47% of US GDP. Public sector procurement amounts to 14-20% of GDP. In the European Union, the public procurement market is 13.6% of the GDP, i.e. 2 trillion Eur, spent by 250,000 public authorities.

More than 60% of Fortune 1000 companies are active on the B2G market, with government customers generally having a positive impact on a firm’s value.

Public-sector organizations generally post tenders in the form of requests-for-proposals, requests-for-information, requests-for-quotations, and sources-sought, to which private suppliers respond. Business-to-government networks provide a platform for businesses to bid on government opportunities that are presented as solicitations, in the form of requests-for-proposals, through a reverse auction.

B2G includes the segment of business-to-business marketing known as public sector marketing, which encompasses marketing products and services to various government levels—local and national—through integrated marketing communications techniques such as strategic public relations, branding, marketing communications, advertising, and web-based communications.

Government agencies typically have pre-negotiated standing contracts vetting the vendors/suppliers and their products and services for set prices. These can be local or national contracts and some may be grandfathered in by other entities. For example, in the United States, California's MAS Multiple Award Schedule will recognize the federal government contract holder's prices on a General Services Administration Schedule.

See also
 B2B (business-to-business)
 B2C (retail)
 Direct-to-consumer (Business-to-Consumer )
 Business marketing
 G2B
 Hit rate
 Industrial marketing
 Marketing
 Tendering

References

E-commerce
Marketing by target group
Information technology management